Trapp is an unincorporated community on the eastern flanks of the Blue Ridge Mountains in western Loudoun County, Virginia.

Unincorporated communities in Loudoun County, Virginia
Washington metropolitan area
Unincorporated communities in Virginia